Kim Crosby may refer to:

 Kim Crosby (racing driver) (born 1964), American stock car racing driver
 Kim Crosby (singer) (born 1960), American singer and musical theatre actress